Leucocoprinus brunneotegulis is a species of mushroom producing fungus in the family Agaricaceae.

Taxonomy 
It was first described in 2011 by the mycologists Rose Marie Dähncke, Marco Contu and Vizzini Alfredo who classified it as Leucocoprinus brunneotegulis.

Habitat and distribution 
The specimen studied was found on decaying leaf litter of pine trees in a greenhouse in the Canary islands.

References 

Leucocoprinus
Fungi described in 2011